Robert Aldous (born 1934 in Mansfield, Nottinghamshire, England) is an English stage and television actor.

Aldous studied at RADA and went on to perform in the West End in plays including The School for Scandal and The Wind in the Willows. On television he has appeared in 'Allo 'Allo, Softly, Softly, Jeeves and Wooster and She Stoops to Conquer.

Filmography

Film

Television

References
Croft, David; Perry, Jimmy; Webber, Richard (2000). The Complete A-Z of Dads Army. Orion.

External links

1934 births
Alumni of RADA
Living people
English male stage actors
English male television actors